Monica Huggett (born 16 May 1953 in London, England) is a British conductor and leading baroque violinist.

Biography
At the age of 16, Huggett started studying at the Royal Academy of Music, London, with Manoug Parikian and Kato Havas, baroque violin with Sigiswald Kuijken.

Huggett co-founded and served as leader of the Amsterdam Baroque Orchestra under Ton Koopman from 1980 to 1987. She was made a Fellow of the Royal Academy of Music in 1994, and serves as professor of baroque violin at the Hochschule für Künste Bremen, Germany. She won Gramophone Awards for her recordings of Bach's Sonatas and Partitas for solo violin (1997) and Biber's violin sonatas (2002).

Huggett was Artistic Director of the Portland Baroque Orchestra from 1995 until 2021. She has also served as the director of The Hanover Band and guest director of the Arion Baroque Orchestra, Montreal; Tafelmusik, Toronto; Orchestra of the Age of Enlightenment; Los Angeles Chamber Orchestra; Philharmonia Baroque, San Francisco; Norwegian Chamber Orchestra; and Concerto Copenhagen. Huggett also worked with Christopher Hogwood at the Academy of Ancient Music; with Trevor Pinnock and the English Concert; and toured the US in concert with James Galway. 

Huggett continues as Artistic Director of the Irish Baroque Orchestra and is guest director of the Seville Baroque Orchestra. She also founded the baroque Ensemble Sonnerie and Hausmusik London as a chamber ensemble which concentrates on romantic music.

Huggett's expertise in the musical and social history of the baroque era, coupled with her unique interpretation of baroque music, has made her a much sought-after resource for students of the baroque violin. She has given master classes in Banff, Dartington, Vicenza, Dublin, The Hague, Medellin and The Royal College of Music.

In 2008 she was appointed director of the new graduate program in historical performance at The Juilliard School in New York City.

Reviews

Heinrich Ignaz Franz von Biber: Violin Sonatas, Nisi Dominus, Passacaglia (Sonnerie / Huggett with Thomas Guthrie)

"This is a disc that merits the attention of anybody who appreciates the highest flights of violin playing, from whatever period"
The Daily Telegraph, August 2001

ASV Gramophone Award Winner 2002 (Baroque Instrumental)

5* BBC Music Magazine, October 2001

“9” rating in Repertoire Magazine (France)

BBC Music Magazine Critics' Choice - December 2001

Heinrich Ignaz Franz von Biber: Mystery Sonatas (vol. 1)

“With the tonal sweetness of Huggett’s three violins resonating pleasingly through the many double- and multiple-stoppings and her bowing demonstrating a delicious lightness and freedom, she admirably displays her eloquent command of Biber’s sublime and richly symbolic language. Huggett’s [approach] is ravishing in its sonorities, her supporting cast adding significantly to the exotic sounds of the various scordaturas and the overall effect of her intelligent, stylish and expressive playing.”
The Strad Magazine, November 2004

Heinrich Ignaz Franz von Biber: Mystery Sonatas (vol. 2)

“Huggett's playing - on three violins - shines with ease and expression”
The Times

“Huggett’s imaginative approach and lively response to detail are among the most rewarding aspects of her version of these emotionally rewarding pieces.”
5* BBC Music Magazine, December 2004

“Of all the recordings now available of Biber...this [is] by far and away the most spectacular, exuberant, colourful and downright ravishing of them all. Huggett positively revels in the virtuosity of Biber’s original...Huggett’s beautifully crafted performance of the complex and, at times, profoundly moving solo Passacaglia rounds off what is a matchless recording from every perspective.”
International Record Review, Nov 2004

Johann Sebastian Bach: Violin Concertos BWV 1041, 1042, 1052 & 1056 (Monica Huggett, Sonnerie)
 
“No matter how many versions of the Bach violin concertos you already own, this one is a must.”
International Record Review

Recordings
Vivaldi: (The four seasons inside).
Il cimento dell'armonia e dell'inventione Op.8. Virgin Classics.
La cetra Op.9. Virgin Classics.

References

External links
 Official homepage
 MONICA HUGGETT IN CONVERSATION WITH GEOFFREY NEWMAN (oct. 2016)
 Biographie on Bach-cantatas.com

1953 births
Living people
Musicians from London
Fellows of the Royal Academy of Music
Women conductors (music)
English classical violinists
English conductors (music)
British performers of early music
Women performers of early music
Juilliard School faculty
Baroque-violin players
Concertmasters
Virgin Classics artists
Women classical violinists
21st-century British conductors (music)
Women music educators
21st-century English women musicians
21st-century classical violinists